William Allen Ellis, Sr., (April 23, 1828November 21, 1900) was an American businessman, Republican politician, and Wisconsin pioneer. He was a member of the Wisconsin State Senate, representing the 1st State Senate district—northeast Wisconsin—during the 1881 and 1882 sessions.

Biography

Ellis was born in Topsham, Maine, and moved to Peshtigo, Wisconsin, in 1857 to work for the Peshtigo Lumber Company. He later worked as a superintendent for the company. He was appointed postmaster at Peshtigo from 1857 through 1872, and also served on the town and county boards. He died in Peshtigo on November 21, 1900.

Electoral history

Wisconsin Senate (1880)

| colspan="6" style="text-align:center;background-color: #e9e9e9;"| General Election, November 2, 1880

References

1828 births
1900 deaths
People from Topsham, Maine
People from Peshtigo, Wisconsin
County supervisors in Wisconsin
Republican Party Wisconsin state senators
19th-century American politicians